Dudley Kingswinford Rugby Football Club is an English rugby union football club based in Kingswinford in the West Midlands. The club currently plays in the fifth tier of English club rugby, participating in the Midlands Premier. The club runs seven senior sides, a ladies team and a full range of junior sides.

Early history
The club was founded in May 1920. Known in its early years as the Bean Football Club, the name Dudley Kingswinford was adopted in 1927. After playing at several grounds the club moved to its current premises in 1962.

Ground
Dudley Kingswinford play home games at Heathbrook, located on the western outskirts of Wall Heath, Kingswinford. The ground is most accessible by car with the nearest train station being Stourbridge Town railway station, over 5 miles away. The ground has four full size pitches (1st XV, 2nd XV, 3rd XV and training), along with five pitches for youth rugby (under-9 to under-13).

The ground capacity for the 1st XV pitch is approximately 2,260, with 260 seated in the main stand and an estimated 2,000 standing pitch side including on the grass banks and by the club-house.

Current standings
Dudley Kingswinford were demoted from National League 2 North at the end of the 2013–14 season and played in National League 3 Midlands from 2014–15. Following a further relegation they play in Midlands 1 West and in the 2016–17 season they finished 4th overall. They were promoted back to Midlands Premier at the end of the 2019–20 season.

Honours
1st team:
Staffordshire Cup winners (2): 1967, 1969
North Midlands Cup winners (5): 1977, 1979, 1989, 2000, 2012
NPI Cup finalists: 1999
Midlands Division 1 champions: 1999–00
Midlands Division 1 West champions (2): 2010–11, 2019–20
National League 3 (north v midlands) promotion play-off winner: 2011–12

2nd team (Dudley Wasps):
Midlands 6 West (South-West) champions: 2006–07
North Midlands Vase winners: 2011

References

External links
Official website

English rugby union teams
Rugby clubs established in 1922
Sport in Dudley